Mickey's Good Deed (also called Mickey's Lucky Break and Mickey Plays Santa in certain home media releases) is a 1932 animated short film produced by Walt Disney Productions and released by United Artists. Set during the Christmas season and the contemporary Great Depression, the cartoon centers on Mickey's act of charity to bring Christmas to a poor family. The film was directed by Burt Gillett and features the voices of Walt Disney as Mickey and Pinto Colvig as Pluto. It was the 50th Mickey Mouse short, and the 14th of that year.

Mickey's Good Deed is the first "Mickey Mouse" titled cartoon to develop with RCA's Photophone synchronized early-in-film sound system.

Mickey's Good Deed was Mickey's second Christmas themed film after Mickey's Orphans (1931).

Plot
Mickey Mouse appears as a street performer playing "O Come, All Ye Faithful" on a cello while Pluto howls along. Several people appear to throw coins in Mickey's collection cup and Mickey wishes them a merry Christmas. But when Mickey goes to buy food, he discovers to his dismay that his cup is full of nails, nuts, and bolts.

Eventually, Mickey comes to the home of a rich family and begins to play outside. Inside the home, a boy named Adelbert keeps refusing different toys that his father and a butler show him. Adelbert throws a tantrum, saying he wants Pluto upon hearing the dog sing. The butler goes outside and persistently offers Mickey money for Pluto, but Mickey refuses and Pluto bites him. While running away, Mickey drops his cello and a horse-drawn sleigh runs it over destroying it. The apparently oblivious party in the sleigh call out a cheerful "Merry Christmas!" to Mickey.

Mickey and Pluto later come across the home of a poor cat family. A mother sits at the table crying and Mickey and Pluto see from a picture that the father is in jail and she has no money for food or toys. Emotionally moved by the scene, Mickey returns to the rich home and reluctantly sells Pluto. With the money, Mickey buys toys and food for the cat family and their mother, who is now snoring as he makes it back to their house and he delivers the goods dressed as Santa Claus. He barely manages to keep it quiet until he has snuck out of the house, just in time to see the children wake up to find all the toys he left. Mickey leaves satisfied that he helped the cat family have a happy Christmas.

Meanwhile, back at the rich home, Adelbert is tormenting Pluto and tying objects, including a roasted chicken, onto Pluto's tail while tossing objects at his father. The frustrated father finally has the butler throw the dog out when Adelbert treats the Christmas tree like a slingshot, with the star poking him from behind, before spanking Adelbert. Pluto then follows Mickey's tracks to where he finds the lonely mouse sitting in front of a fire along with a snow sculpture of Pluto. Pluto burrows through the snow and pops his head out the top of the sculpture surprising Mickey. The two friends happily share the pig family's roasted chicken for a Christmas dinner upon reuniting.

Voice cast
 Mickey Mouse: Walt Disney
 Pluto, Kid's father, toy effects: Pinto Colvig
 Weeping mother, kittens: Marcellite Garner

Home media
The short was released on December 7, 2004 on Walt Disney Treasures: Mickey Mouse in Black and White, Volume Two: 1929-1935.

Additional releases include:
1986 – "Jiminy Cricket's Christmas" (VHS)
2005 – "Holiday Celebration with Mickey & Pals" (colorized, DVD)

See also
Mickey Mouse (film series)
 List of Christmas films

References

External links

Mickey's Good Deed at the Disney Film Project
Mickey's Good Deed at Animation Backgrounds
Mickey's Good Deed reviewed by Dennis Grunes
 

1932 films
1932 animated films
Mickey Mouse short films
Pluto (Disney) short films
1930s Disney animated short films
American Christmas films
Great Depression films
Films directed by Burt Gillett
Films produced by Walt Disney
Animated films about music and musicians
American black-and-white films
1930s Christmas films
1932 comedy films
1932 drama films
1932 comedy-drama films
1930s American films